Andries Kinsbergen (25 September 1926 – 24 June 2016) was a Belgian lawyer and politician.

Education
Andries Kinsbergen went to highschool at the Royal Athenaeum of Deurne. An auditorium at his old highschool was named after him in 2010.

In 1951, he graduated with a doctorate in Law at the Vrije Universiteit Brussel (VUB).

Career 
He started his career as a lawyer in Antwerp and also worked as an assistant at the VUB. Later he became professor at the RUCA. He was governor of the Belgian province Antwerp from 1 January 1967 until 1 October 1993. Since 1993, he was Minister of State. Kinsbergen died 24 June 2016.

Honours 
 Minister of State, By Royal Decree. 
 21 December 1995: Knight Grand Cordon in the Order of Leopold.
 13 januari 1992 : Knight Grand Cross in the  Order of the Crown.
 15 November 1971: Knight Commander  in the Order of Leopold II .
 22 juni 2000: Commander of the Legion of Honour.
 4 januari 1977: Knight Grand Officer in the Order of Orange-Nassau.

References

Sources
 Steve Heylen, Bart De Nil, Bart D’hondt, Sophie Gyselinck, Hanne Van Herck en Donald Weber, Geschiedenis van de provincie Antwerpen. Een politieke biografie, Antwerpen, Provinciebestuur Antwerpen, 2005, Vol. 2 p. 111

1926 births
2016 deaths
Governors of Antwerp Province
Belgian Ministers of State
Grand Crosses of the Order of the Crown (Belgium)
Free University of Brussels (1834–1969) alumni
20th-century Belgian lawyers